Korea National Training Center, also known as the Taereung Training Center, located in Gongneung-dong, Nowon-gu, in the northeast part of Seoul, is the first national athletic training center established in South Korea. 

Since its establishment on 30 June 1966 by the Korea Sports Council (대한체육회 大韓體育會), Taereung Training Center has been the home of elite Korean sports activities. The training facilities have accommodated 20 different sport events such as athletics, gymnastics, archery, taekwondo, wrestling, swimming, and others.

In 2011, a newer facility, Jincheon National Training Center, was built to replace the crowded Taereung Training Center.

See also

Sports in South Korea
Korea National Sport University

References

External links
Official website

Nowon District
Sports venues in Seoul
Sports venues completed in 1966